Alexandr Vasilievich Kolobnev (born 4 May 1981) is a Russian former professional road bicycle racer. His major victories include winning the 2007 Monte Paschi Eroica, a stage of the 2007 Paris–Nice and he is a two-time winner of the Russian National Road Race Championships. In 2011, he was provisionally suspended after testing positive for a potential drug masking agent.

Career
His second season saw him sign with Domina Vacanze–Elitron. There, he took his first victory in Stage 2 of the Settimana Internazionale di Coppi e Bartali. He stayed with Domina Vacanze through the 2004 season and signed with UCI ProTeam  for 2005. With Rabobank he managed to capture Stage 1 of the Volta a la Comunitat Valenciana in 2006.

He won the third stage of Paris–Nice, became the inaugural winner of the Monte Paschi Eroica, now known as Strade Bianche, and finished second at the UCI Road World Championships. Kolobnev finished fourth in the road race at the 2008 Olympic Games. Second-place finisher Davide Rebellin later tested positive for Continuous erythropoietin receptor activator (CERA), causing the IOC to strip him of his silver medal. Though the UCI considers Kolobnev promoted to third in the race's standings, he has not been awarded a bronze medal.

Controversies

Exonerated doping test
In the 2011 Tour de France he tested positive for the diuretic hydrochlorothiazide, a masking agent that can hide the presence of performance-enhancing drugs. He was subsequently pulled from the tour by his team, and his results for that stage were annulled. Despite his B sample also testing positive he only received a fine from the Russian cycling federation. However this was later appealed by the UCI to CAS, although he was subsequently cleared of any charges on 29 February 2012. Kolobnev rejoined  in March 2012.

Acquitted on case 2010 Liège–Bastogne–Liège
In 2012, the Union Cycliste Internationale initiated an investigation of Kolobnev and the Kazakh rider Alexander Vinokourov over allegations brought by the Swiss news magazine L'lllustre and Italian newspaper Corriere della Sera. They accused Vinokourov of cutting a deal with Kolobnev in 2010 to aid Vinokourov in winning Liège–Bastogne–Liège, alleging €150,000 exchanged hands. On 12 September 2019, prosecutors requested a six-month jail sentence for Kolobnev and Vinokourov, with an additional fine of €50,000 for Kolobnev, as well as €150,000 to be confiscated from his bank account. Kolobnev and Vinokourov were cleared on 5 November 2019, with the judge citing a "lack of concrete evidence" for the court's decision.

Personal life
He lives in Dénia, Spain, with his wife Daria and two sons and one daughter, David, Alexander and Aprelia. He opened a hotel in Dénia which had several altitude simulation rooms, a permitted method to increase athletic performance.

Major results

1999
 1st Overall Giro della Lunigiana
2001
 1st Gran Premio di Poggiana
 4th Road race, UCI Under-23 Road World Championships
 4th Gran Premio Industrie del Marmo
2002
 9th GP Industria & Artigianato di Larciano
2003
 2nd Gran Premio di Lugano
 2nd Giro dell'Emilia
 4th Overall Settimana Internazionale di Coppi e Bartali
1st Stage 2
 4th Coppa Sabatini
 5th La Flèche Wallonne
 6th Trofeo Città di Castelfidardo
2004
 1st  Road race, National Road Championships
 1st  Young rider classification Settimana Internazionale di Coppi e Bartali
 2nd Gran Premio Nobili Rubinetterie
 7th Overall Brixia Tour
 8th Gran Premio di Lugano
 8th Trofeo Matteotti
 10th Road race, Olympic Games
2005
 2nd Overall Niedersachsen Rundfahrt
 7th Road race, UCI Road World Championships
 8th Overall Danmark Rundt
2006
 4th Overall Volta a la Comunitat Valenciana
1st Stage 1
 5th Overall Tour de Pologne
 7th Overall Sachsen Tour
 9th Rund um den Henninger Turm
2007
 1st Monte Paschi Eroica
 1st Stage 3 Paris–Nice
 1st Stage 2 (TTT) Deutschland Tour
 2nd  Road race, UCI Road World Championships
 5th Overall Tour de Wallonie
 9th Giro dell'Emilia
2008
 2nd Clásica de San Sebastián
 3rd  Road race, Olympic Games
 3rd Giro dell'Emilia
 5th Klasika Primavera
 5th Coppa Sabatini
 6th Overall Tour de Wallonie
2009
 2nd  Road race, UCI Road World Championships
 2nd GP Miguel Induráin
 3rd Overall Tour de Wallonie
 3rd Giro di Lombardia
 4th Overall Tour of Ireland
 6th Amstel Gold Race
 7th Giro dell'Emilia
 9th Overall Tour of Slovenia
 9th Clásica de Almería
 9th Liège–Bastogne–Liège
2010
 1st  Road race, National Road Championships
 2nd Liège–Bastogne–Liège
 3rd GP Miguel Induráin
 4th Giro dell'Emilia
 7th Road race, UCI Road World Championships
2011
 2nd GP Miguel Induráin
 5th Amstel Gold Race
2012
 2nd Road race, National Road Championships
 3rd Grand Prix Cycliste de Montréal
 4th Overall Tour de Pologne
 5th Grand Prix of Aargau Canton
 9th Trofeo Melinda
2013
 3rd Overall Tour de Wallonie
1st Stage 1
 3rd Tre Valli Varesine
 7th Strade Bianche
 9th Coppa Ugo Agostoni
2014
 7th GP Miguel Induráin
 10th Grand Prix of Aargau Canton
2016
 1st  Mountains classification Volta ao Algarve
 10th Overall Giro di Toscana

Grand Tour general classification results timeline

References

External links

 
 Palmares on CyclingBase.com

1981 births
Living people
People from Vyksa
Russian male cyclists
Olympic cyclists of Russia
Cyclists at the 2004 Summer Olympics
Cyclists at the 2008 Summer Olympics
Cyclists at the 2012 Summer Olympics
Olympic bronze medalists for Russia
Olympic medalists in cycling
Doping cases in cycling
Medalists at the 2008 Summer Olympics
Sportspeople from Nizhny Novgorod Oblast